A number of research centers and institutes are based at George Washington University (GW), a university in the Washington, D.C., in the United States. Among these are:

List of chartered centers and institutes listed by the GW's Office of the Vice President for Research 
The following are listed by GW's Office of the Vice President for Research as listed chartered centers and institutes at GW.

Other GW centers and research institutes 
The Center for Health and Health Care in Schools (CHHCS) is a "nonpartisan policy analysis and program-development research center" at GWU's Milken Institute School of Public Health (formerly the School of Public Health and Health Services). Primarily funded by the Robert Wood Johnson Foundation, the center "has been a leader in the development of school-based health center programs for children for more than twenty years and is the current incarnation of the Making the Grade Program that began funding school-based health centers in the 1980." In addition to its research and demonstration grant programs related to school-based health centers, the center has conducted research and organized programs on school mental health programs and school oral health programs. CHHCS was previously known as the School-Based Adolescent Health Care Program National Program Office (1987–1992) and the Making the Grade National Program Office (1993–2000).
The Center for the Connected Consumer (CCC) at the George Washington University School of Business is co-directed by Donna Hoffman and Tom Novak, both professors of marketing at GW. The CCC says that it "is dedicated to understanding how consumers interact with smart devices in post-social media environments."
The George Washington University Heart & Vascular Institute (formerly the Richard B. and Lynne V. Cheney Cardiovascular Institute) is part of GW's School of Medicine & Health Sciences. In fiscal year 2014, the center reported slightly over $5 million in total research support. Richard J. Katz, M.D., Walter A. Bloedorn Professor of Medicine at GW, directs the center.
The Institute for Politics, Democracy & the Internet is the research arm of GW's Graduate School of Political Management.
The Jacobs Institute of Women's Health is part of GW's Milken Institute School of Public Health. It describes itself as "a nonprofit organization working to improve health care for women through research, dialogue, and information dissemination."

References

External links
Chartered Centers & Institutes - By Alphabetical Order - from the GWU Office of the Vice President for Research
Chartered Centers & Institutes - By School  - from the GWU Office of the Vice President for Research

George Washington University
Research institutes in Washington, D.C.
George Washington University
University research institutes